This is a list of notable Malagasy musicians and musical groups.

 AmbondronA
 Vaiavy Chila
 Mily Clément
 Ninie Doniah
 Rakoto Frah
 D'Gary
 Régis Gizavo
 Eusèbe Jaojoby
 Lego
 Mahaleo
 Erick Manana
 Jerry Marcoss
 Toto Mwandjani
 Oladad
 Rabaza
 Naka Rabemanantsoa
 Andrianary Ratianarivo
 Olombelona Ricky
 Rossy
 Mama Sana
 Senge
 Madagascar Slim
 Tarika
 Tearano
 Justin Vali
 Nicolas Vatomanga

Malagasy
Madagascar